
Year 77 BC was a year of the pre-Julian Roman calendar. At the time it was known as the Year of the Consulship of Brutus and Lepidus (or less frequently, year 677 AUC). The denomination 77 BC for this year has been used since the early medieval period, when the Anno Domini calendar era became the prevalent method in Europe for naming years.

Events 
 By place 

 Roman Republic 
 Marcus Aemilius Lepidus, Roman proconsul of transalpine gaul and leader of the populares faction in the senate, is defeated by Quintus Lutatius Catulus at the milvian bridge outside Rome. The remnants of the rebels are wiped out by Pompey in Etruria.
 Lepidus, with some 21,000 troops, manages to escape to Sardinia. Soon afterwards he becomes ill and dies, his battered army, now under command by Marcus Perperna Vento, sails on to the Iberian Peninsula. 
 Pompeius marches along the Via Domitia through Gallia Narbonensis crossing the Pyrenees to Spain. He joins with Quintus Metellus Pius to suppress the revolt of Quintus Sertorius, but is at first unsuccessful.

 Armenia 
 The city of Tigranakert of Artsakh is built.

Births 
 Berenice IV Epiphaneia, Greek princess and queen of the Ptolemaic Kingdom (d. 55 BC)
 Liu Xiang, Chinese scholar, editor of the Shan Hai Jing, compilator of the Lienü zhuan, and father of Liu Xin (d. 6 BC)

Deaths 
 Marcus Aemilius Lepidus, Roman statesman and consul (b. 120 BC)
 Tian Qianqiu, Chinese politician and prime minister
 Titus Quinctius Atta, Roman comedy writer 
 Vattagamani Abhaya, king of Sri Lanka

References